Antour is a village in Benipur Subdivision, Alinagar Block under Darbhanga district in Bihar state, in northeastern India. It is located 28 km towards East from District headquarters Darbhanga. 5 km from Alinagar. 138 km from State capital Patna. Antour Pin code is 847103 and postal office in Antour itself (Branch office of Benipur) . This Place is in the border of the Darbhanga District and Madhubani District. Madhubani District Lakhnaur is North towards this place. Antour is famous for Panchlal Mahadev Mandir - five Shivlings.

Neighbouring Village
Nawada (1 km), Balha (1 km), Derukh (1 km), Ramouli ( 4 km ), Adhloam ( 4 km ), Kiratpur ( 5 km ), Benipur ( 2 km ), Sajhuar ( 5 km ) are the nearby Villages to Antour. Antour is surrounded by Benipur Block towards west, Alinagar Block towards East, Tardih Block towards North, Ghanshyampur Block towards East .

Village Festivals
Chhath celebration by Nav Chetna Vikash Samiti, Makar Sankranti - Village organise unique Makar Mela in the same day of festival and Shivratri in Panchanath Mahadev Mandir

Neighbouring Cities
Jhanjharpur, Darbhanga, Madhubani, Samastipur, Muzaffarpur, Rosera are the nearby Cities to Antour.

Education
Bahera College Bahera Darbhanga
Address :
Janta Kosi College, biraul
Address : Supaul Bazar, biraul
Sati Bharat Mahavidyalya Parari
Address :
Jayanand College Nehra
Address : Near Mahabir Sthan, Nehra
Bahera College, Bahera
Address :
Schools in Antour
Rajkeeya Krit Vidyalay Antour
Address : AT+P.O=Antour, VIA=BENIPUR, BLOCK=ALINAGAR, P.S=BAHERA, DISTRICT=DARBHANGA, BIHAR 847103

References

Villages in Darbhanga district